Wiesław Małyszko (born 7 December 1970) is a Polish boxer. He competed in the men's welterweight event at the 1992 Summer Olympics.

References

External links
 

1970 births
Living people
Polish male boxers
Olympic boxers of Poland
Boxers at the 1992 Summer Olympics
People from Żywiec County
Welterweight boxers